Robert J. Ortiz (born May 30, 1983) is a former American football wide receiver. He was signed by the San Diego Chargers as an undrafted free agent in 2006. He played college football at San Diego State.  
Ortiz has also been a member of the Frankfurt Galaxy, Seattle Seahawks, BC Lions, New England Patriots, San Francisco 49ers and Hartford Colonials.
Robert is also a model & actor, whom appeared in the former ABC reality show Expedition Impossible.

Professional career

Frankfurt Galaxy
Ortiz was selected by the Frankfurt Galaxy in the eight round of the 2007 NFL Europa Free Agent Draft. He appeared in eight games (including four starts) and finished as the team's third-leading receiver with 27 receptions for 255 yards and two touchdowns.

Hartford Colonials
Ortiz was drafted by the Hartford Colonials in the seventh round of 2010 UFL Draft.

After football
Ortiz was a contestant on the 2011 season of the reality game show Expedition Impossible.

References

External links
Just Sports Stats
New England Patriots bio
San Diego State Aztecs bio
San Diego Lifestyle video interview
SDSU Football Podcast
Daily Aztec Article
Robert Ortiz DJ Website
 

1983 births
Living people
Players of Canadian football from San Diego
Players of American football from San Diego
American football wide receivers
American players of Canadian football
Canadian football wide receivers
San Diego State Aztecs football players
San Diego Chargers players
Frankfurt Galaxy players
Seattle Seahawks players
BC Lions players
New England Patriots players
San Francisco 49ers players
Hartford Colonials players
American sportspeople of Mexican descent